Glenview Historic District may refer to:

Glenview Historic District (Glenview, Kentucky), listed on the NRHP in Jefferson County, Kentucky
Glenview Historic District (Memphis, Tennessee), listed on the NRHP in Tennessee

See also
Glenview (disambiguation)